Francis Horace Stubley (1833–1886) was a politician in Queensland, Australia. Born 1833 in England, Died 23 February 1886 in Queensland, Australia. He was a Member of the Queensland Legislative Assembly. He was member for Kennedy from 28 November 1878 to 5 October 1883. Popular amongst the young labourers in the goldfields, Stubley won his seat with overwhelming support.

In 1884 Stubley was sentenced to prison for bankruptcy and concealing assets but released soon after.

References

Members of the Queensland Legislative Assembly
1886 deaths
1833 births
19th-century Australian politicians
English emigrants to colonial Australia